Victoria Club de Fútbol is a Spanish football club based in the municipality of A Coruña, in the autonomous community of Galicia. Founded in 1943, they currently play in Preferente de Galicia – Group 1, holding home matches at the Campos Municipais de Fútbol de San Pedro de Visma.

History
Founded in February 1943, Victoria played amateur leagues (named Modestos A Coruña at the time) until 1993, when they entered in the Tercera Regional, the lowest league tier. The club achieved promotion to the Segunda Regional in 1996 after finishing in the first position, and went on to play in the division until 2009, when they achieved promotion to the Primeira Autonómica.

After achieving a first-ever promotion to the Preferente de Galicia in 2020, Victoria qualified to the 2021–22 Copa del Rey after defeating Juventud Cambados in the cup play-offs final.

Season to season

Notable players
 Amancio
 Raúl García (youth)
 Rubén de la Barrera

References

External links
 

Football clubs in Galicia (Spain)
Association football clubs established in 1943
1943 establishments in Spain